Samuel Abiodun Saanumi (born 19 December 1991) is a Nigerian footballer currently playing as a forward for Veroskronos Tsuno.

Career statistics

Club
.

Notes

References

1991 births
Living people
Nigerian footballers
Nigerian expatriate footballers
Association football forwards
Japan Football League players
J3 League players
Saint George S.C. players
Ethiopian Coffee S.C. players
Tegevajaro Miyazaki players
Nigerian expatriate sportspeople in Ethiopia
Expatriate footballers in Ethiopia
Nigerian expatriate sportspeople in Japan
Expatriate footballers in Japan